Route 140 is a state highway in Connecticut in the northeastern part of the Greater Hartford area. Route 140 is a main artery connecting the town of Stafford to Windsor Locks.

Route description
Route 140 starts out at Route 75, in Windsor Locks as Elm Street.  It then begins an overlap with Route 159, before reaching a bridge, and turning away from Route 159. Now known as Bridge Street, it crosses the Connecticut River into East Windsor, then meets an intersection with I-91.  Shortly thereafter, it meets an intersection with US 5, before changing its street name to North Road.  It then becomes Sadd's Mill Road.  It meets an intersection with Route 286, before becoming Maple Street.  It then meets an overlap with Route 83, before becoming Crystal Lake Road.  Route 140 then meets an overlap with Route 30, as it becomes Sandy Beach Road.  Route 140 then ends as it reaches Route 190 and Route 32 in Stafford.

History
Route 140 was commissioned in 1932, running from US 5 to Route 83 along the current routes of Routes 191, 140, and 286. In the 1920s, this route was known as State Highway 307. In 1961, with the opening of the Bradley Airport Connector as part of Route 20, Routes 140 and 191 were rerouted to their current locations in Windsor Locks and East Windsor. The following year, Route 140 in Windsor Locks was relocated from Spring Street (old Route 20) to Elm Street (former SR 523). In 1963, Route 140 was extended to its eastern terminus in Stafford, and rerouted slightly north to absorb a connector (Route 140A) between Route 83 and the center of Ellington in the process.  In the late 1990s and 2002, the alignment was straightened in several parts of East Windsor and Ellington.

Junction list

References

140
Transportation in Hartford County, Connecticut
Transportation in Tolland County, Connecticut